This is a list of numbered roads in Peterborough County, Ontario, Canada. 

Peterborough
Transport in Peterborough County